Ronald "Boo" Hinkson is a guitarist from Saint Lucia who combines jazz with soca music (Caribbean). He started his career by forming the band Tru Tones. His mother plays the guitar, and she was his first teacher. He has been praised by guitarists George Benson and Stanley Jordan. In 2016 he became the first person from Saint Lucia to be a judge at the Grammy Awards.

Discography
 2003 Beyond (Zephryn)
 2012 Shades (Zephryn)

References

External links
 Official site

Living people
Caribbean jazz guitarists
Saint Lucian musicians
Year of birth missing (living people)